John Mathew Matthan  (also John Mathew Mathan/John Mathew) is an Indian filmmaker from the southern state of Kerala. He is known for his 1999 Bollywood film Sarfarosh, starring Aamir Khan and Naseeruddin Shah

Film career
John started his career as an assistant director on the epic movie Gandhi, directed by Sir Richard Attenborough. Also working on Gandhi was Govind Nihlani, who Matthan would later assist for several films before shifting to directing advertisements.

In the early 1990s, Matthan started his own production company in Mahalaxmi, Mumbai called Cinematt Pictures Pvt Ltd. The company, which also involved Matthan's brother George, released its first feature film entitled Sarfarosh in 1999. Matthan began work on Sarfarosh in 1992. Seven years were spent on the research, pre-production, and production of the film until it was finally released to both critical and commercial success.
The reviewer for Filmfare rated the film four stars out of five and wrote about Matthan, "Although this is his first film, director John Mathew Matthan draws perfectly crafted outputs from his entire cast."

After Sarfarosh, Matthan started working on a script which involved the issue of brain drain. However, after the tragedy of 9/11, the script lost its pertinence and Matthan moved on to another idea that germinated in the form of Shikhar (2005). Although critically acclaimed, the film did not fare too well at the box office.

In 2007, Matthan began work on his next film titled A New Love Ishtory. Written by Vipul K Rawal and starring Himesh Reshammiya and Niharika Singh, the film was completed in 2009 but its release delayed to 29 September 2013 due to a falling out with Himesh Reshammiya and his record label T-Series.

Filmography

Awards

Accolades
Chairperson jury feature film, Indian Panorama at 51st International Film Festival of India, Goa 2021.

References

External links 
 

20th-century Indian film directors
Living people
Filmfare Awards winners
Film directors from Kerala
Film producers from Kerala
Producers who won the Best Popular Film Providing Wholesome Entertainment National Film Award
Directors who won the Best Popular Film Providing Wholesome Entertainment National Film Award
Year of birth missing (living people)